Bengal Cricket Academy Ground is a cricket ground in Kalyani, West Bengal, India. The first recorded match on the ground was in 2011/12. It was used as a venue for a first-class match in the 2015–16 Ranji Trophy tournament between Bengal and Odisha. It had previously hosted four List A matches in the 2014–15 Vijay Hazare Trophy.

See also
 List of cricket grounds in India

References

External links
Bengal Cricket Academy Ground at CricketArchive

Cricket grounds in West Bengal
2011 establishments in West Bengal